Three warships of Japan have borne the name Chitose:

 , a  launched in 1898 and expended as a target in 1931
 , a  originally launched in 1936 as a seaplane carrier, converted into a light aircraft carrier in 1943, and sunk in 1944
 , a  launched in 1971 and stricken in 1999

Imperial Japanese Navy ship names
Japanese Navy ship names